Boissano ( or , locally ) is a comune (municipality) in the Province of Savona in the Italian region Liguria, located about  southwest of Genoa and about  southwest of Savona.

Boissano borders the following municipalities: Bardineto, Borghetto Santo Spirito, Loano, Pietra Ligure, and Toirano.

References

Cities and towns in Liguria